Jean-Michel Bellot (born 6 December 1953) is a retired male pole vaulter from France. He was born in Neuilly-sur-Seine, Hauts-de-Seine.

Achievements

1Representing Europe

References

sports-reference

1953 births
Living people
French male pole vaulters
Athletes (track and field) at the 1976 Summer Olympics
Athletes (track and field) at the 1980 Summer Olympics
Olympic athletes of France
Sportspeople from Neuilly-sur-Seine
Mediterranean Games silver medalists for France
Mediterranean Games medalists in athletics
Athletes (track and field) at the 1979 Mediterranean Games
20th-century French people
21st-century French people